The AK Ladies Open is a tournament for professional female tennis players played on indoor carpet courts. The event is classified as a $60,000 ITF Women's World Tennis Tour tournament and has been held in Altenkirchen, Germany, since 2014.

Past finals

Singles

Doubles

External links 
 ITF search
 Official website

ITF Women's World Tennis Tour
Carpet court tennis tournaments
Tennis tournaments in Germany
2014 establishments in Germany
Recurring sporting events established in 2014